Slukino is a rural locality (a village) in Kupriyanovskoye Rural Settlement, Gorokhovetsky District, Vladimir Oblast, Russia. The population was 21 as of 2010. There are 4 streets.

Geography 
Slukino is located on the Klyazma River, 5 km west of Gorokhovets (the district's administrative centre) by road. Gorodishchi is the nearest rural locality.

References 

Rural localities in Gorokhovetsky District